was a three-piece all-female rock band which consisted of Eriko Hashimoto (guitar, vocals), Akiko Fukuoka (bass, chorus), and formerly Kumiko Takahashi (drums, chorus) who are from Tokushima Prefecture on the island of Shikoku, Japan.

From 2005, they were signed to Sony Music Japan's Ki/oon Records record label. In November 2017, the band announced that they were disbanding.

The band had their final single-act concert on July 4, 2018, at the Nippon Budokan, and held their last "Konason Fest" on July 21 and 22.

History

2000–2004: Band formation
In 2000, Eriko Hashimoto formed Chatmonchy while at high school in the city of Tokushima, Tokushima Prefecture. Having seen her brother perform at the first concert she attended, she decided to form a trio. Although she had been part of a brass band throughout junior high and high school, her brother began teaching her guitar.

According to Hashimoto, "one of the members insisted on using the word 'monchi', like 'monkey'." The name derived from an image of a cute monkey doll named "Monchhichi", from the Hiroshi Jinsenji-directed animation series Futago no Monchhichi, which ran 130 episodes through 1980. The group then picked the word "chat" randomly from a dictionary to make the name. However, after graduation, the three members went their separate ways.

Fukuoka, then in the same grade and at the same high school as Hashimoto, joined to make an acoustic duo, and performed one show when a male drummer pulled out right before a concert in April 2004. Takahashi sat in the audience of the show and at the time was in another band, but was known to the duo via the Light Music Club of their university in Tokushima, Shikoku.

The band independently produced an album, entitled  (out of distribution) and sold it themselves, chiefly by hand in the Tokushima area, achieving as many as 1500 sales and record label solicitations.

2005–2008: Albums
On 23 November 2005, with Supercar's Junji Ishiwatari as producer, Chatmonchy released chatmonchy has come, their first album with the Ki/oon Records label. The album sold over 20,000 copies. The group then moved permanently to Tokyo.

In March of the following year, the band released the single , but it did not chart. In July 2006, the band released the album  which debuted at number 10 on the Oricon album charts. The following November, the single  debuted at number 6 on the Oricon single chart. The song was also used as the ending theme to the anime Hataraki Man.

In April 2007, the band released the single  but it failed to chart. The following June, Chatmonchy released the single  and it debuted at number 9 on the Oricon single chart. In September 2007, they released the single , meaning bitter orange. This song was used as the 12th ending theme of the anime series Bleach. "Daidai" also debuted at number 12 on the Oricon single charts. In October of the same year, the band released the album , which debuted at number 2 on the Oricon album charts. In November 2007, Chatmonchy released their first DVD, .

In February 2008, Chatmonchy released the single  and the live DVD . The single debuted at number 11 on the Oricon single chart. Later that year in June, the band released the single  which debuted at number 8 on the Oricon single charts. Then in November, they released the single , which debuted at number 10 on the Oricon single charts.

2009–2018
On February 4, 2009, Chatmonchy released the single "Last Love Letter" which debuted at number 7 on the Oricon single charts. That March, they released the album , and the BD  The album debuted at number 2 on the Oricon album charts.

On March 19, 2010, Chatmonchy played at the prestigious SXSW festival in Austin, Texas as part of the Japan Nite tour. The band also took the chance to do a mini-tour of the US, visiting New York, San Francisco and Los Angeles. Later that year, their song "Koko Dake no Hanashi" (ここだけの話?, "Just Between Us") was used as the opening of the anime series Kuragehime.

On July 29, 2011, Kumiko announced that she would be leaving the band on friendly terms at the end of September 2011 after the last of the band's current gigs had finished. The band continued as a duo from October 2011.

In May 2013 Eriko announced her marriage to Tacica's Shoichi Igari, and that she was six months pregnant. Eriko gave birth to her son on 17 October 2013, her 30th birthday.

On May 13, 2015, Chatmonchy released their sixth full album called "Kyōmei". This was also the first album featuring their new support band members.

On November 24, 2017, Chatmonchy announced that they would be disbanding in July 2018. Their final album, "Tanjō" was released in June 2018.

Since the disbanding, both band members have worked on their own solo projects with Eriko releasing a demo CD and Akiko producing for the band Yonige.

Band members

 Eriko Hashimoto – lead vocals, guitars, keyboards, drums (2000–2018)
 Akiko Fukuoka – bass, backing vocals, keyboards, piano, drums (2002–2018)
 Kumiko Takahashi – drums and percussion, backing vocals (2003–2011)

Touring members
Aiko Kitano – drums, backing vocals (2014–2016)
Hiroko Sebu– keyboards, backing vocals (2014–2016)
Ryōsuke Shimomura – keyboards, guitar, backing vocals (2014–2016)
Akira Tsuneoka – drums (2014–2016)

Timeline

Discography

 Miminari (2006)
 Seimeiryoku (2007)
 Kokuhaku (2009)
 You More (2011)
 Henshin (2012)
 Kyōmei (2015)
 Tanjō (2018)

References

External links 
 Official chatmonchy Website

Ki/oon Music artists
All-female bands
Japanese musical trios
Japanese pop rock music groups
Japanese indie rock groups
Musical groups established in 2000
Musical groups disestablished in 2018
Musical groups from Tokushima Prefecture
2000 establishments in Japan
2018 disestablishments in Japan